Riese (German for "giant") was the code name for a construction project of Nazi Germany between 1943 and 1945. It consisted of seven underground structures in the Owl Mountains and Książ Castle in Lower Silesia, which was then Nazi Germany and is now Poland.

None of them were finished, and all are in different states of completion with only eleven per cent reinforced by concrete.

The purpose of the project remains uncertain because of the lack of documentation. Some sources suggest that all the structures were part of the Führer Headquarters; according to others, it was a combination of headquarters (HQ) and arms industry but comparison to similar facilities can indicate that only the castle was adapted as an HQ or other official residence and the tunnels in the Owl Mountains were planned as a network of underground factories.

The construction work was done by forced labourers, prisoners of war (POWs), and prisoners of concentration camps, and many lost their lives, mostly as a result of disease and malnutrition.

History 

Due to increasing Allied air raids, Nazi Germany relocated a large part of its strategic armaments production into safer regions including Province of Lower Silesia. Plans to protect critical infrastructure also involved transfer of the arms factories to underground bunkers and construction of air-raid shelters for government officials.

In September 1943, Minister of Armaments and War Production Albert Speer and the senior management of Organisation Todt started talks on Project Riese. As a result, the Industriegemeinschaft Schlesien (Silesian Industrial Company) was created to conduct construction work. In November, collective camps (Gemeinschaftslager) were established for forced labourers, mainly from the Soviet Union and Poland, POWs from Italy, the Soviet Union, and later Poland as an aftermath of the Warsaw Uprising (List of camps).

A network of roads, bridges, and narrow gauge railways was created to connect excavation sites with the nearby railway stations. Prisoners were reloading building materials, cutting trees, digging reservoirs and drainage ditches. Small dams were built across streams to create water supplies and sewage systems. Later the rocks of the mountains were drilled and blasted with explosives and the resulting caverns were reinforced by concrete and steel. For this purpose mining specialists were employed, mostly Germans, Italians, Ukrainians and Czechs, but the most dangerous and exhausting work was done by prisoners.

The progress of digging tunnels was slow because the structure of the Owl Mountains consists of hard gneiss. Most of the similar facilities were bored in soft sandstone but harder, more stable rocks gave the advantage of total protection from Allied air raids and the possibility of building 12 m high underground halls with a volume of 6,000 m3.

In December 1943, a typhus epidemic occurred amongst the prisoners. They were held in unhygienic conditions, exhausted and starving. As a result, construction slowed down significantly. There were at least five collective camps and an unknown number of forced labourers and POWs worked for the project, some until the end of the war. It is also undetermined how many prisoners lost their lives.

In April 1944, dissatisfied with the progress of the project, Adolf Hitler decided to hand over the supervision of construction to the Organisation Todt and assign prisoners of concentration camps to work. They were deployed in thirteen labour camps (Arbeitslager, AL), some in the vicinity of the tunnels. The network of these camps has been named Arbeitslager Riese (List of camps) and was part of the Gross-Rosen concentration camp. The administration of AL Riese and the camp commander, SS-Hauptsturmführer Albert Lütkemeyer, were located in AL Wüstegiersdorf. From December 1944 to January 1945 the prisoners were guarded by 853 SS troops.

According to incomplete data, at least 13,000 prisoners worked for the project. Most of them were transferred from the Auschwitz concentration camp. The documents allow identification of 8,995 prisoners. All of them were Jews, about seventy per cent from Hungary, the rest from Poland, Greece, Romania, Czechoslovakia, the Netherlands, Belgium, and Germany. Mortality was very high because of disease, malnutrition, exhaustion, dangerous underground works, and the treatment of prisoners by German guards. Many exhausted prisoners were sent back to the Auschwitz concentration camp. The deportation of 857 prisoners is documented as well as 14 executions after failed escape attempts. An estimated total of 5,000 victims lost their lives.

At the end of 1944, another typhus epidemic occurred amongst the prisoners. Because the front line of the war was approaching, evacuation of the camps began in February 1945, however in a few places work might have been conducted even at the end of April. Some prisoners were left behind, mostly badly ill, until the Red Army arrived in the area in May 1945. Project Riese was abandoned at the initial stage of construction and only 9 km (25,000 m2, 100,000 m3) of tunnels were dug out.

Individual structures of the project 

German code names of individual structures of the project are unknown because of the lack of documentation. Polish names were created after the war.

Książ Castle 

Książ Castle (German: Fürstenstein) is located in the city of Wałbrzych (German: Waldenburg) . Its last owner in the inter-war period was the Hochberg family, one of the wealthiest and most influential European dynasties, Hans Heinrich XV, Prince of Pless and his English wife, Mary-Theresa Olivia Cornwallis-West (Princess Daisy). As a result of their extravagant lifestyle and the global economic crisis they fell into debt. 

In 1941, the castle and the lands were seized by the Nazi government, partly to pay taxes, partly as punishment for the perceived treason of their sons. At that time one of them served in the British Army, another in the Polish Armed Forces in the West. The castle, under the leadership of architect Hermann Giesler, was first adapted to accommodate the management of the state-owned railways (Deutsche Reichsbahn) but in 1944 it became part of Project Riese. In 1941–1944, it was also a place where parts of the collection of the Prussian State Library had been hidden.

The works in the castle were extensive and led to the destruction of many decorative elements. New staircase and elevator shafts were built to improve emergency evacuation routes. The most serious work however took place below the castle. There are two levels of tunnels. The first is 15 m underground and was accessible from the fourth floor of the castle by a lift and a staircase from the cellar and also by an entrance from the gardens. The tunnel (80 m, 180 m2, 400 m3) is reinforced by concrete and leads to an elevator shaft hidden 15 m under the courtyard, a connection between the first and the second level of the underground. The shaft (35 m) has not been explored because it is filled with rubble. A provisional, short tunnel from the gardens was bored to assist in its excavation.

The second level of underground (950 m, 3,200 m2, 13,000 m3) is 53 m under the courtyard. Four tunnels were bored into the base of the hill: 1. (88 m), 2. (42 m), 3. (85 m), 4. (70 m). The complex contains large tunnels (5 m high and 5.6 m wide) and four chambers. Seventy-five per cent is reinforced by concrete. There are two additional shafts leading to the surface, one with dimensions 3.5 m x 3.5 m (45 m) and one with diameter 0.5 m (40 m), presently used to supply electricity.

Above ground are foundations of buildings and machinery, two reservoirs of water, a pumping station, and remains of a sewage treatment plant. In 1975–1976 four bunkers Ringstand 58c, and a guardroom were demolished. The narrow gauge railway connecting the tunnels with the railway siding in the village of Lubiechów (German: Liebichau) was dismantled after the war.

In May 1944, AL Fürstenstein was established in the vicinity of the castle . Between 700 and 1,000 concentration camp prisoners lived in barracks. They were Jews, citizens of Hungary, Poland, and Greece. Evacuation of the camp took place in February 1945.

Today the castle and the undergrounds are open to the public. The second level also contains seismological and geodesical measuring equipment belonging to the Polish Academy of Sciences.

Complex Rzeczka 

The complex is located on a borderline between the villages of Rzeczka (German: Dorfbach) and Walim (German: Wüstewaltersdorf), inside Ostra Mountain (German: Spitzenberg) . Drilling work began in March 1944. Three tunnels were bored into the base of the mountain. The structure contains a nearly completed guardroom and large underground halls, up to 10 m in height. The total length of the tunnels is 500 m (2,500 m2, 14,000 m3). Eleven per cent is reinforced by concrete. 

Above ground are foundations of machinery and a concrete bridge. The second bridge was damaged and replaced by a footbridge. A narrow-gauge railway, used for transportation of spoil to a nearby heap, was dismantled after the war. In 1995 the underground was opened to the public and in 2001 transformed into a museum.

In November 1943, Gemeinschaftslager I Wüstewaltersdorf was established in textile factory Websky, Hartmann & Wiesen AG . Its prisoners were forced labourers, mainly from the Soviet Union, Poland and POWs from Italy, captured by the German army after the Italian armistice and switching sides. The most numerous group consisted of POWs from the Soviet Union. They were detained in the part of the camp subordinate to Stalag VIII-A Görlitz. It was liberated in May 1945.

In April 1944, AL Wüstewaltersdorf was created in the same location for prisoners of concentration camps, mostly Jews from Greece. Some sources suggest the camp might have been located on the slopes of Chłopska Mountain (German: Stenzelberg); according to others, its existence is doubtful.

Complex Włodarz 

The complex is located inside Włodarz Mountain (German: Wolfsberg) . It is a grid of tunnels (3,100 m, 10,700 m2, 42,000 m3) and large underground halls, up to 12 m in height. Less than one per cent is reinforced by concrete. It was accessible by four tunnels bored into the base of the mountain with chambers for guardrooms. There is a shaft leading to the surface with diameter 4 m (40 m). Some tunnels have higher, second levels connected by small shafts. This is a stage of building underground halls. Two tunnels were bored, one over the other and then the ceiling was collapsed to create a large space. Some parts of the complex are flooded but accessible by boat. From 2004 it is open to visitors.

Above ground are foundations of machinery, numerous unfinished or destroyed buildings, a bunker, two reservoirs of water, and depots of building materials including thousands of fossilized bags of cement. The network of narrow gauge railways, connecting the tunnels with the railway siding in the village of Olszyniec (German: Erlenbusch), was disassembled and scrapped after the war.

In May 1944, AL Wolfsberg was established , probably by taking over an existing camp from the Organization Schmelt. About 3,000 concentration camp prisoners lived in tents made of plywood, 3 m in diameter, 20 people in each one and several barracks. They were Jews, mainly from Hungary and Poland, but also from Greece, Czechoslovakia, Germany, and Romania. The ruins of concrete barracks for SS guards can still be found in the vicinity of the camp. Evacuation of the prisoners started in February 1945.

Complex Osówka 

The complex is located inside Osówka Mountain (German: Säuferhöhen) . It is accessible by tunnel number 1 (120 m) with chambers for guardrooms and tunnel number 2 (456 m), bored 10 m below the level of the main underground, with guardrooms close to completion. Behind them there is a connection of two levels created by the collapse of the ceiling. 

The structure is a grid of tunnels (1,750 m, 6,700 m2, 30,000 m3) and underground halls, up to 8 m in height. Only 6.9% is reinforced by concrete. There is a shaft leading to the surface with a diameter of 6 m (48 m). Tunnel number 3 (107 m) is not connected to the complex. It is 500 m away and 45 m below the main underground. It contains two dams and hydraulic equipment of an unknown purpose.

Above ground are foundations of buildings, machinery, a ramp for transportation of mine cars to different levels, a reservoir of water and depots, some with systems of heating up building materials in winter. The largest structure is a single-storey, concrete building (680 m2, 2,300 m3) with walls 0.5 m thick and roof adapted for camouflage by vegetation (0.6 m). A utility tunnel (1.25 m x 1.95 m, 30 m) was under construction to connect it with the shaft. Another structure of unknown purpose is a concrete monolith (30.9 m x 29.8 m) with tens of pipes, drains and culverts, buried into the rock at least 4.5 m. A narrow gauge railway network connected the tunnels with the railway station in the village of Głuszyca Górna (German: Oberwüstegiersdorf). Since 1996, the complex is open to the public.

In August 1944, AL Säuferwasser was established for prisoners of concentration camps . They were Jews, citizens of Poland, Hungary, and Greece. The remains of the camp can still be found in the vicinity of the tunnel number 3. Its evacuation took place in February 1945.

Complex Sokolec 

The complex is located near the village of Sokolec (German: Falkenberg), inside Gontowa Mountain (German: Schindelberg). It consists of two underground structures on different levels. Tunnels number 1 and 2, with chambers for guardrooms, lead to the underground up to 5 m in height . It is collapsed in many places because the complex was bored in soft sandstone. 

In 2011 excavation of tunnel number 3 (145 m) has begun, inaccessible since the end of war because of its collapsed entrance. It is 600 m away and 60 m below tunnels number 1 and 2 . Tunnel number 4 (100 m) was opened in 1994, one of only two short tunnels which were found with mining equipment from 1945. It is located 250 m from tunnel number 3, on the same level but not connected. The total length of the complex is 1,090 m (3,025 m2, 7,562 m3). It is not reinforced by concrete.

Above ground are foundations of buildings, machinery and two ramps for transportation of mine cars to different levels. A retaining wall (47 m) was built to secure a new road. A narrow gauge railway connected the tunnels with the railway siding in the village of Ludwikowice Kłodzkie (German: Ludwigsdorf).

In April 1944, AL Falkenberg was established in the hamlet of Sowina (German: Eule) for prisoners of concentration camps . It was inhabited by 1,500 men of Jewish origin from Poland, Hungary, and Greece. Evacuation of the camp took place in February 1945.

Complex Jugowice 

The complex is located in the village of Jugowice (Jawornik) (German: Hausdorf (Jauering)), inside Dział Jawornicki Mountain (German: Mittelberg) . Tunnels number 2 (109 m) and 4 lead to a small underground level. There is a shaft with a diameter of 0.5 m – 0.6 m (16 m) in the vicinity of the complex but not connected to it. Tunnel number 6 is collapsed 37 m from the entrance and has not been explored yet. It was closed by two steel doors 7 m apart. The rest of the tunnels are in the initial stage of construction: 1. (10 m), 3. (15 m), 5. (3 m), 7. (24.5 m). The total length of the structure is 460 m (1,360 m2, 4,200 m3). Less than one per cent is reinforced by concrete.

Above ground are foundations of buildings, machinery, a pumping station, and a reservoir of water. A narrow gauge railway connected the tunnels with the railway siding in the village of Olszyniec (German: Erlenbusch) where AL Erlenbusch was established in May 1944 . Between 500 and 700 concentration camp prisoners lived in five barracks. They were Jews, citizens of Hungary and Poland. The camp was liberated in May 1945.

Complex Soboń 

The complex is located inside Soboń Mountain (German: Ramenberg)  and is accessible by tunnels number 1 (216 m) and 2 (170 m). Tunnel number 3 is not connected to the main underground. It is collapsed in its initial part on the length of 83 m. In 2013 it was explored when a shaft was dug from above, revealing 86 m of tunnel with mining equipment from 1945. The total length of the complex is 700 m (1,900 m2, 4,000 m3). Less than one per cent is reinforced by concrete.

Above ground are foundations of machinery and a pumping station, a reservoir of water, depots of building materials, numerous unfinished or destroyed buildings, a bunker, and earthworks carried out on a massive scale. A narrow gauge railway network connected the tunnels with the railway station in the village of Głuszyca Górna (German: Oberwüstegiersdorf). In October–December 1944, AL Lärche was established for prisoners of concentration camps, mostly Jews from Poland and Greece. They lived in twelve barracks made of plywood in the vicinity of the tunnel number 3 . Evacuation of the camp took place in February 1945.

Jedlinka Palace 

The palace is located in the village of Jedlinka (German: Tannhausen) . In 1943, it was purchased by the Nationalsozialistische Volkswohlfahrt (National Socialist People's Welfare) from the Böhm family as a result of their financial problems. At the beginning of 1944 the plans to transform it into a hospital were disrupted because the building was confiscated by military authorities and adapted as headquarters for the Industriegemeinschaft Schlesien (Silesian Industrial Company) which, until then, occupied Haus Hermannshöhe in the nearby town of Bad Charlottenbrunn (Polish: Jedlina-Zdrój). 

An air-raid shelter was created in the cellar with armoured, gasproof doors. The corporation was responsible for construction work and supervising all companies and local businesses taking part in the project on behalf of the Main Building Commission of the Ministry of Arms. (List of companies) Most companies used forced labour.

In April 1944, the Industriegemeinschaft Schlesien was deemed too inefficient and replaced by the Organisation Todt (OT). The Oberbauleitung Riese (OBL Riese) (Site management Riese) was established under supervision of Ministerial Director Franz Xaver Dorsch and Hans Meyer, Chief of OBL Riese and the whole area of Lower Silesia. Construction Office, located in Haus Mohaupt in the town of Wüstewaltersdorf (Polish: Walim), was supervised by senior construction managers Leo Müller and Fritz Leonhardt. In July 1944, 30,788 people worked for OBL Riese.

In February 1945, because the front line of the war was approaching, OBL Riese evolved into headquarters of Front-OT X Brigade. The task of the new formation was the reconstruction of damaged communication systems. The palace was occupied by the OT until May 1945. Presently it is open to the public.

Głuszyca 

The town of Głuszyca (German: Wüstegiersdorf) and its vicinity was the location of many labour camps connected to Project Riese. From October 1943 to March 1945 manufacturing plants of Friedrich Krupp AG were relocated here from Essen. They took over two textile factories belonging to Meyer-Kauffmann Textilwerke AG and adapted them to armaments production. An air-raid shelter was built inside a nearby hill . It consists of two tunnels, sixty per cent reinforced by concrete and bricks (240 m, 600 m2, 1,800 m3).

In November 1943, Gemeinschaftslager III Wüstegiersdorf was established for forced labourers from the Soviet Union in textile factory of Kammgarnspinnerei Stöhr & Co. AG  and existed until the end of the war. In April 1944, AL Wüstegiersdorf was created in the same location for prisoners of concentration camps, between 700 and 1,000 Jews from Hungary and Poland. It was also a main storehouse of food and clothes, administration center, and headquarters for the commander of AL Riese. Evacuation of the camp took place in February 1945.

In November 1943, Gemeinschaftslager II Dörnhau was established in the village of Kolce (German: Dörnhau). The camp occupied a closed textile factory of brothers Giersch  and was inhabited by forced labourers from Poland and the Soviet Union. In June 1944, AL Dörnhau was created in the same location for prisoners of concentration camps from Hungary, Poland, and Greece of Jewish origin. Several barracks were added. That autumn, the camp was also designated as a central infirmary for severely ill with no prospects of recovery. Twenty-five local mass graves have been excavated after the war with 1,943 victims. The camps were liberated in May 1945.

In November 1943, Gemeinschaftslager IV Oberwüstegiersdorf was established in the village of Głuszyca Górna (German: Oberwüstegiersdorf) . The camp was located in the building of closed textile factory and existed until the end of the war. Its prisoners were forced labourers and POWs. In April–May 1944, AL Schotterwerk was created in the same village near the railway station for prisoners of concentration camps . Between 1,200 and 1,300 Jews from Hungary, Poland, and Greece lived in 8–11 wooden barracks. Part of prisoners joined the evacuation column in February 1945. The others were freed in May.

In March 1944, Gemeinschaftslager V Tannhausen was established in the village of Jedlinka (German: Tannhausen) for forced labourers and POWs in textile factory of Websky, Hartmann & Wiesen AG . In April–May 1944, AL Tannhausen was created in the same location for prisoners of concentration camps. It was inhabited by 1,200 men of Jewish origin from Hungary, Poland, Greece, and other European countries. Next to the camp, Zentralrevier Tannhausen, central infirmary was set up in November 1944 . It was reserved for patients with good chance of recovery. They were housed in four brick barracks. Those prisoners, who were able to walk, were evacuated in February 1945. In the camp only the sick were left, who were liberated in May.

In August 1944, AL Kaltwasser was established in the village of Zimna Woda (German: Kaltwasser) . Concentration camp prisoners of Jewish origin from Poland lived in five barracks. The camp was closed in December 1944 and the prisoners were transferred to AL Lärche.

In April–June 1944, AL Märzbachtal was established in the valley of Potok Marcowy Duży (German: Grosser Märzbachtal)  for prisoners of concentration camps. Between 700 and 800 Jews, mainly from Hungary and Poland, lived in barracks of which remnants can still be seen today. Evacuation of the camp took place in February 1945.

Gallery

List of camps

List of companies 

Companies that took part in the project:

See also 
 Gross-Rosen concentration camp
 Jonas Valley
 Mittelwerk
 Weingut I
 Kőbánya cellar system

Notes

References

External links 

 Project Riese
 Gross-Rosen Museum/History of AL Riese
 Discover the Secrets of Książ Castle

Nazi subterranea
1945 disestablishments in Germany
Gross-Rosen concentration camp
Fortifications in Poland
Research and development in Nazi Germany
Sudetes
Unfinished buildings and structures
Holocaust locations in Poland
Nazi war crimes in Poland